I is the debut album from Wu-Tang Clan-affiliated producer Cilvaringz. Cilvaringz limited all production to in-house Wu-Tang producers only, a formula applied to Wu-Tang albums recorded between 1993 and 1997.Allmusic.com gave the album 4 out of 5 stars and an Album of the Month notation. I sold 62800 copies worldwide with the majority of sales in the United States.

Track listing

References

2007 debut albums
Cilvaringz albums
Babygrande Records albums
Albums produced by RZA
Albums produced by Mathematics
Albums produced by Bronze Nazareth
Albums produced by 4th Disciple
Albums produced by Cilvaringz